McDowall is an outer northern suburb in the City of Brisbane, Queensland, Australia.

Geography 

McDowall is notable for the Raven Street Reserve, which is a  bushland area surrounded by urban housing and busy roads. It is part of a long stretch of forest and green areas going from the mountains in the west to the mangrove areas on the coast.

It has many species of wildflowers and grass trees (see image below) which when in flower have a long central flowering stem that attracts bees.

Trees include weeping myrtle and native blueberry ash (Elaeocarpus reticulatus) with creek fauna such as water dragons (Physignathus lesueurii), turtles and native fish including the crimson spotted rainbow fish. There are also squirrel gliders, possums and scrub turkeys with occasionally a swamp wallaby being sighted. The bird life is abundant and in keeping with its name has a significant crow or raven population.

Many of the roadways in McDowall are themed to commemorate noted celebrities and pioneers in the film and television industry, both locally and abroad. Valentine McDowall Park acknowledges the pioneering work in radio and television broadcasting in Queensland by Dr. Valentine McDowall during the period 1920–1940.

History

The bushland was protected by Greenbelt designation in 1950s when the local area was subdivided, and has been managed by council since 1972.

McDowall's earliest housing establishments were built through the 1970s and very few houses in McDowall were built before then. More housing was later built in the 1980s and early 1990s, whereas defence housing was later developed during the early 21st century.

McDowall State School was opened on 28 January 1975 with 36 students and six teachers. The school was named before the suburb was named. The school was named in honour of Colonel John McDowall, who was a distinguished early-settler of the area. As the population grew, the Brisbane City Council considered naming the suburb Annand after Colonel Frederick Annand. This was disapproved of by local residents, who wanted the suburb to be named after the newly opened school. The name McDowall was therefore accepted for the area by the Place Names Board of Queensland in 1975.

The median age of the Mcdowall population was 38 years of age, 1 year above the Australian median. 78.5% of people living in Mcdowall were born in Australia, compared to the national average of 69.8%; the next most common countries of birth were England 3.3%, New Zealand 2.6%, South Africa 1.5%, Italy 1.3%, India 1.1%. 87.1% of people spoke only English at home; the next most common languages were 2.9% Italian, 1.3% Cantonese, 1% Mandarin, 0.5% Greek, 0.4% Hindi.

Education
McDowall State School is a government primary (Prep-6) school for boys and girls at 1018 Rode Road. In 2018 the school had an enrolment of 997 students with 64 teachers (57.6 full-time equivalent) and 34 non-teaching staff (24.4 full-time equivalent). It includes a special education program.

Amenities

McDowall Village shopping centre is located at 109 Beckett Road (corner of Hamilton Road). It is anchored by Drakes Supermarket.

Transport 
A number of bus services also travel through the area going to local shopping centres such as Chermside, Aspley, and Brisbane City.

References

External links
 Centre for the Government of Queensland: Queensland Places: McDowall
 
 

Suburbs of the City of Brisbane